Ruovesi is a municipality of Finland.

It is located in the Pirkanmaa region.

Neighbouring municipalities are Juupajoki, Mänttä-Vilppula, Orivesi, Tampere, Virrat and Ylöjärvi.

The municipality is unilingually Finnish.

Helvetinjärvi National Park is located in Ruovesi. The biggest lake in the area of the municipality is Lake Ruovesi. 
The educational department takes part in Lifelong Learning Programme 2007–2013 in Finland.

People born in Ruovesi
Väinö Nyström (1857 – 1918)
Verner Järvinen (1870 – 1941)
Kalle Häkkinen (1878 – 1919)
Akseli Anttila (1897 – 1953)
Jorma Gallen-Kallela (1898 – 1939)
Eila Eskola-Kyröläinen (1931 – 2015)
Kimmo Latvamäki (1976 – )

See also
Orivesi

References

External links

Municipality of Ruovesi – Official website

 
Populated places established in 1565
1565 establishments in Sweden